Mughal-e-Funk is an instrumental funk band from Pakistan. The band comprises Kami Paul (drummer), Farhan Ali (bass), Rakae Jamil (sitar), and Rufus Shahzad (keyboards & synths). The band has featured in popular shows including Coke Studio, Levi's Live, and Bisconni Music.

Bisconni Music 
Mughal-e-Funk appeared in music show, Bisconni Music and performed Sakal Ban (originally written by Amir Khusrau) with Meesha Shafi. The song was also featured by Rolling Stone India. They also performed Meda Ishq with Mohammad Aizaz Sohail and Mahnoor Altaf.

Sultanat 
Mughal-e-Funk released its debut ep Sultanat in 2018. The EP comprises six songs and each song is named after a Mughal Emperor.

Discography

References

External links 
 Mughal-e-Funk on Facebook

Pakistani musical groups
Instrumental early music groups